Vadaka Veedu is a 1979 Indian Malayalam film,  directed by Mohan and produced by Mubarak. The film stars Sukumari, Anupama, Sukumaran and Ittoop in the lead roles. The film has musical score by M. S. Viswanathan.

Cast
Sukumari
Anupama
Sukumaran
Ittoop
Master Sujith
P. K. Abraham
Ravi Menon
Vidhubala

Soundtrack
The music was composed by M. S. Viswanathan and the lyrics were written by Bichu Thirumala.

References

External links
 

1979 films
1970s Malayalam-language films
Films scored by M. S. Viswanathan